The Malaysian Ministry of Youth and Sports, abbreviated KBS, is a ministry of the Government of Malaysia that is responsible for youth, sports, recreation, leisure activities, stadiums, youth development, and youth organisations in the country.

Organisation
 Minister of Youth and Sports
 Deputy Minister of Youth and Sports
 Secretary-General
 Under the Authority of Secretary-General
 National Department of Youth and Sports
 Rakan Muda Development Division
 Youth Development Division
 Sports Development Division
 State Departments of Youth and Sports
 Sports Commissioner Office
 Legal Advisor Office
 Internal Audit Unit
 Registrar of Youth Office
 Corporate Communication Unit
 Integrity Unit
 SEA Games Secretariat
 2050 National Transformation Secretariat
 Anti-Doping Unit
 National Sports Council
 Malaysia Stadium Corporation
 National Sports Institute
 Institute for Youth Research Malaysia
 Deputy Secretary-General (Management)
 Human Resources Management Division
 Information Management Division
 Management Services Division
 Finance Division
 Development Division
 Account Division
 Deputy Secretary-General (Strategic)
 Policy and Strategic Planning Division
 International Relations Division
 Youth Skill Development Division
 IKTBN/IKBN

Federal departments
 National Department of Youth and Sports, or Jabatan Belia dan Sukan Negara (JBSN). (Official site)
 Malaysia Sports Commissioner Office, or Pejabat Pesuruhjaya Sukan Malaysia (PPS). (Official site)
 Registrar of Youth Office (ROY), or Pejabat Pendaftar Pertubuhan Belia. (Official site)

Federal agencies
 National Sports Council of Malaysia (NSC), or Majlis Sukan Negara Malaysia (MSN). (Official site)
 Malaysia Stadium Corporation, or Perbadanan Stadium Malaysia. (Official site)
 National Sport Institute, or Institut Sukan Negara (ISN). (Official site)
 Institute for Youth Research Malaysia, or Institut Penyelidikan Pembangunan Belia Malaysia (IPPBM). (Official site)
 Youth and Sports Skill Training Institution, or Institusi Latihan Kemahiran Belia dan Sukan (ILKBS). (Official site)
 Youth Parliament of Malaysia, or Parlimen Belia Malaysia. (Official site)
 International Youth Centre, or Pusat Belia Antarabangsa. (Official site)
 National Youth Consultative Council, or Majlis Perundingan Belia Negara (MPBN). (Official site)

Key legislation
The Ministry of Youth and Sports is responsible for administration of several key Acts:
 National Sports Council of Malaysia Act 1971 [Act 29]
 Sports Development Act 1997 [Act 576]
 Youth Societies and Youth Development Act 2007 [Act 668]
 Perbadanan Stadium Malaysia Act 2010 [Act 717]
 National Sports Institute Act 2011 [Act 729]

Policy Priorities of the Government of the Day
 National Youth Policy
 National Sports Policy

Programmes
 Putrajaya Youth Festival
 National Sports Day
 1Malaysia Skilled Youth Program
 e-Youth System
 Malaysian Youth Map Application
 No Reason! Sports For All, Active Malaysia, Towards Active, Healthy, United Malaysia

History
The early formation of the Ministry of Youth and Sports begun in 1953 with the incorporation of the Culture Division under the Department of Public Welfare. At that time, The Culture Division was given the role and responsibility of handling all matters relating to the youth affairs in Malaysia.

Later in 1964, the Culture Division was placed under the Ministry of Information. At the same time, as a consequence of the growth of organisational activities among youths, a Youth Division was formed to inculcate and supervise these activities under the ministry. Besides that, a Sports Division was also formed under the Ministry of Information.

The Ministry of Youth and Sports was only formed on 15 May 1964 in conjunction with the National Youth Day celebration of that year. In 1972, the Culture Division was established, and this has led the Ministry of Youth and Sports to change its name to the Ministry of Culture, Youth and Sports until 1987, as the Culture Division was eventually relocated under the Ministry of Culture, Arts and Tourism. Since then, the Ministry of Culture, Youth and Sports was reverted to its original name which, today, known as the Ministry of Youth and Sports.

Ministry of Youth and Sports (MYS) was given the mandate to implement the policies of the Malaysian government, particularly in the areas of Youth and Sports development.

On 5 April 2018, the current Malaysian government recognised the Malaysian Deaf Sports Association as the sole national federation to deal with the deaf sports after passing the amendment of National Sports Development Act which got approved in the parliament. The Ministry of Youth and Sports, Khairy Jamaluddin presented the amendment of the National Sports Development Act to the parliament which was approved on 3 April 2018.

See also
Minister of Youth and Sports (Malaysia)

References

External links
 Ministry of Youth and Sports of Malaysia Official Website
 
 
 

 
Federal ministries, departments and agencies of Malaysia
Malaysia
Malaysia
Youth in Malaysia
Sport in Malaysia
Youth sport in Malaysia